Fethullah Qa'ravi Isfahani (‎ 1850–1920) was a Persian cleric and rebel.

Early life 
He was the child of Mohammad Javad Namazi, the Marja of Isfahan. 

He studied at the Isfahan Seminary, the same Mashhad seminary that taught Mirza Hassan Nasrallah Madras, Ibrahim Boroujerdi, and Seyed Morteza Haeri. He returned to Isfahan in 1878.

Career 
After the death of Muhammad Taqi Shirazi, he led an uprising against Iraqi and British influence in Iran.

Teaching 
In 1896, he went to Mecca on the Hajj where he had discussions with Sunni scholars. His most important lessons were on:

 Higher education jurisprudence
 Commentary and Quranic sciences
 Philosophy and theology

Professors 
* Mirza Mohammad Hashim khansari
 Mullah Haider Ali Isfahani
 Nasrallah Madras
 Sheikh Mohammed Sadiq Tonekaboni
 Mullah Ahmad Sabzevari
 Sheikh Abdol javad Khorasani
 Mohammad Taqi heravi
 Mohammad Rahimi Boroujerdi
 Mirza Habibollah rashti

Students 
 Sayed Hadi Hosseini Shirazi
 Sayed Mohammad Taghi khansari
 Mirza Abu'l-Qasem Zanjani
 Agha Zia Addin Araghi
 Seyyed Hossein Borujerdi
 Abdul-Karim Ha'eri Yazdi
Muhammad Hujjat Kuh-Kamari
Shahab al-Din Mar'ashi Najafi
Muhsin al-Hakim
Muhammad-Amin al-Imami al-Khu'i

Death 
Fethullah Qa'ravi Isfahani died in 1920 due to coronary artery disease. In the courtyard of the Imam Ali Mosque in Razavi, he was buried in one of the eastern stands.

References 

Iranian grand ayatollahs
1850 births
1920 deaths
Burials at Imam Ali Mosque
Pupils of Muhammad Kadhim Khorasani